Polyommatini is a tribe of lycaenid butterflies in the subfamily of Polyommatinae. These were extensively studied by Russian novelist and lepidopterist Vladimir Nabokov.

Genera
Genera in this tribe include:

 Actizera
 Acytolepis
 Afarsia
 Agriades
 Alpherakya
 Aricia – arguses
 Azanus – babul blues
 Bothrinia
 Brephidium
 Cacyreus
 Caerulea
 Caleta
 Callenya
 Callictita
 Castalius – Pierrots
 Catochrysops
 Catopyrops
 Cebrella
 Celastrina
 Celatoxia
 Chilades – jewel blues 
 Cupido
 Cupidopsis – meadow blues
 Cyaniris
 Cyclargus
 Danis
 Discolampa
 Echinargus
 Eicochrysops
 Eldoradina
 Elkalyce
 Epimastidia
 Erysichton
 Euchrysops – Cupids
 Eumedonia
 Euphilotes
 Famegana
 Freyeria
 Glabroculus
 Glaucopsyche
 Grumiana
 Harpendyreus
 Hemiargus
 Icaricia
 Iolana
 Ionolyce
 Itylos
 Jameela
 Jamides – ceruleans
 Kretania
 Lampides
 Lepidochrysops
 Leptotes – zebra blues
 Lestranicus
 Luthrodes
 Lycaenopsis – hedge blues
 Lysandra
 Madeleinea
 Maurus
 Megisba
 Micropsyche
 Monodontides
 Nabokovia
 Nacaduba
 Neolucia
 Neolysandra
 Neopithecops
 Notarthrinus
 Nothodanis
 Oboronia
 Orachrysops
 Oraidium
 Oreolyce
 Orthomiella
 Otnjukovia
 Palaeophilotes
 Pamiria
 Paraduba
 Paralycaeides
 Parelodina
 Patricius
 Perpheres 
 Petrelaea
 Phengaris
 Philotes
 Philotiella
 Phlyaria
 Pistoria
 Pithecops
 Plautella
 Plebejidea
 Plebejus
 Plebulina
 Polyommatus
 Praephilotes
 Prosotas 
 Pseudochrysops
 Pseudolucia
 Pseudonacaduba
 Pseudophilotes
 Pseudozizeeria
 Psychonotis
 Ptox
 Rhinelephas
 Rimisia
 Rueckbeilia
 Rysops
 Sahulana
 Sancterila
 Scolitantides
 Shijimia
 Sidima
 Sinia
 Sinocupido
 Subsolanoides
 Talicada
 Tartesa
 Tarucus – blue Pierrots
 Thaumaina
 Theclinesthes
 Thermoniphas
 Tongeia
 Turanana
 Tuxentius – pied Pierrots
 Udara
 Una
 Upolampes
 Uranobothria
 Uranothauma
 Zintha – blue-eyed Pierrot
 Zizeeria
 Zizina
 Zizula

References

 
Butterfly tribes